UTC Climate, Controls & Security was a global provider of building technologies offering fire safety, security, building automation, heating, ventilating, air-conditioning, and refrigeration systems and services. A wholly owned subsidiary of United Technologies Corporation, UTC Climate, Controls & Security was a $16.7 billion company with 55,000 employees serving customers in more than 180 countries.

In 2020, United Technologies spun off this subsidiary into the independent Carrier Global Corporation.  At the same time United Technologies spun off Otis Worldwide Corporation, and then the remaining United Technologies units (Pratt & Whitney and Collins Aerospace) merged with the Raytheon Company to create Raytheon Technologies.

History 
Based in Palm Beach Gardens, Florida, UTC Climate, Controls & Security  was created by splitting up UTC Building & Industrial Systems into two segments, Otis and UTC Climate, Controls & Security. Otis provides elevator and escalator manufacturing installation, while UTC Climate, Controls & Security's brands provide building technologies, heating and cooling, fire safety and security and refrigeration products and services.

Through its brands, UTC Climate, Controls & Security dates back to 1818, when Jeremiah and Charles Chubb patented the world's first detector lock. In 1881, Robert Edwards patented the first electric alarm bell. In 1902, Willis Carrier developed and later patented the first modern air conditioner. And in 1917, Walter Kidde founded the Walter Kidde Company, which produced the first integrated smoke detection and carbon dioxide extinguishing system for use on board ships.

Brands 

 Automated Logic, a building-management solutions company
 Autronica, a provider of fire and gas safety systems for offshore, maritime and land applications
 Carrier, a heating, air-conditioning, ventilating and refrigeration solutions company founded by Willis Carrier, the inventor of modern air conditioning
 Carrier Transicold, a container and truck / trailer transport refrigeration company
 Chubb, a company that provides fire safety and security solutions, which range from electronic security systems to manned guarding operations
 Delta Security Solutions, an electronic security company located in France
 Det-Tronics, a company specialising in industrial fire detection, gas detection, and hazard mitigation systems
 Edwards, a fire detection and alarm business
 Fireye, a provider of flame safeguard controls; combustion controls
 The former GE Security business, a fire and security systems company, acquired in 2010
 GST, a fire detection and alarm business located in China
 Interlogix, security and life-safety solutions for residential and commercial applications
 Kidde, a specialist in fire systems for detection, suppression and fire fighting
 Lenel Systems International, a developer and provider of advanced electronic security systems, acquired in 2005
 Marioff, a water mist fire suppression systems company acquired in 2007
 NORESCO, a U.S.-based energy services company (Northeast Energy Services Company)
 Onity, a provider of electronic locks, in-room safes and energy management solutions
 Supra, lock and key management systems
 Sicli, a supplier of fire extinguishers and hose reels in France and Switzerland
 Sensitech, a cold chain solutions provider based in the U.S.
 Taylor, a manufacturer of commercial foodservice equipment to service frozen desserts, beverages and grilled items
 UTEC, manufactures microprocessor-based controls for the HVAC and refrigeration industries

Products and services 
 Access Control Systems
 Industrial and Commercial Fire Safety
 Consumer and Residential Fire Safety
 Hazard Sensing and Combustion Control
 Electronic Security
 Commercial Refrigeration
 Transport Refrigeration
 Heating, Ventilating, Air Conditioning
 Monitoring and Response
 Physical Security
 Cash in Transit
 Security Personnel
 Intrusion sensors
 Digital Video

References

External links
 Official website

United Technologies
Fire detection and alarm companies
Companies based in Palm Beach County, Florida
Palm Beach Gardens, Florida
Security companies of the United States